Lung Kong World Federation School Limited Lau Wong Fat Secondary School (abbr. LWFSS) is a co-educational secondary school aided by the Education Bureau. It was established in 1977 by the Lung Kong Clans, named after Lau Wong-fat.

School Motto 
The School Motto, "Loyalty, Righteousness, Benevolence and Courage (忠、義、仁、勇)", bears the characteristics of historical figures Liu Bi, Guan Yu, Zhang Fei and Zhao Zilung of the Three Kingdoms. It acquires students with the upright qualities of prudence, moral sense and persistence, so that they may have a fulfilling life.

Subjects Offered in the 2018/2019 School Year

Houses 
 North House (忠社) (Red)
 South House (義社) (Blue)
 East House (仁社) (Green)
 West House (勇社) (Yellow)

Public transportation to school 
 Buses: 2, 2A, 2A, 36B, 212, 118
 MTR: Prince Edward station Exit C2 or D

Notable alumni 
Antonio Lam Hin-Chung (林衍聰), a Hong Kong professional fencer.

Affiliated schools 
LKWFSL Wong Yiu Nam Primary School 
LKWFS Ltd. Lau Tak Yung Memorial Primary School 
LKWFSL Chu Sui Lan Anglo-Chinese Kindergarten

See also 
 Education in Hong Kong
 List of secondary schools in Hong Kong

References

External links 
 School Website
 Parent-Teacher Association
 Secondary School Profiles 2018/2019 of LWFSS

Secondary schools in Hong Kong